Albert Joseph Wakefield (19 November 1921 – November 2006) was an English professional footballer. He played for Leeds United and Southend United. He joined Leeds in 1942 and scored over 80 goals in a career of just five years. He moved to Southend in 1949 as part of a trade for Frank Dudley and went on to play over 100 times for them.

References

External links
 Profile at leeds-fans.org.uk

2006 deaths
1921 births
English footballers
Leeds United F.C. players
Southend United F.C. players
Association football forwards
English Football League players